Merton London Borough Council in London, England is elected every four years; it has administrative control over the London Borough of Merton.

Since the last boundary changes in 2022, 57 councillors have been elected from 20 wards.

History

Establishment 
The thirty-two London boroughs were established in 1965 by the London Government Act 1963. They are the principal authorities in Greater London and have responsibilities including education, housing, planning, highways, social services, libraries, recreation, waste, environmental health and revenue collection. Some of the powers are shared with the Greater London Authority, which also manages passenger transport, police and fire.

Political control 
Since the foundation of the council, political control of the council has been held by the following parties:

Leadership
The leaders of the council since 1965 have been:

Local political parties

Longthornton and Tamworth Residents Association 

Longthornton and Tamworth Residents Association is a residents association in the Longthornton area, which lies in the triangle between Pollards Hill, Streatham Vale and Mitcham Eastfields. Between 1964 and 1994, LTRA contested elections in Merton, initially in the Mitcham Central ward. After the borough's wards were redrawn in 1978 and the Mitcham Central ward abolished, the LTRA contested elections in the Longthornton ward.

LTRA won between three and four seats in the elections between 1964 and 1978. At the 1982 election, it was defeated by the Conservatives, who took all three seats in Longthornton. It subsequently regained a seat at a by-election in March 1984 and retook all three seats in the 1986 election. At the 1994 election, LTRA lost two seats to Labour. This was the last election that was contested by LTRA. By the time of the 1998 election, its last councillor no longer sat for the party.

Merton Park Ward Residents Association 

Merton Park Ward Residents Association is a residents association in the Merton Park ward. The MPWRA has two councillors on Merton London Borough Council, and for this purpose is registered as the political party Merton Park Ward Independent Residents.

The MPWRA was formed in 1989 in order to contest a by-election that October in the Merton Park ward, caused by the resignation of a Conservative councillor. The MPWRA opposed the proposed extension of the A24 relief road across a corner of the Merton Park Conservation Area, which required the demolition of several Victorian houses. At the by-election, Bridget Smith was elected for the MPWRA; this hung the council. In the following year's local elections, the MPWRA gained all three council seats of the Merton Park ward, becoming the third-largest party on the council. The A24 relief road was not extended.

The MPWRA held every seat in the ward in all subsequent elections, although the number of seats for the ward was reduced to two ahead of the 2022 elections. After the 2010 elections, the MPWRA provided support for a minority Labour administration until Labour regained a majority at the 2014 elections. Following seat gains for the Liberal Democrats on other wards at the 2018 elections, the MPWRA became the fourth-largest party on the council.

Since its founding, the MPWRA has campaigned for the redevelopment of Nelson Hospital and the regeneration of Morden's town centre. The MPWRA publishes a quarterly local publication known as Forum.

Borough result maps

List of council elections
 1964 Merton London Borough Council election
 1968 Merton London Borough Council election
 1971 Merton London Borough Council election
 1974 Merton London Borough Council election
 1978 Merton London Borough Council election (boundary changes increased the number of seats by three)
 1982 Merton London Borough Council election
 1986 Merton London Borough Council election
 1990 Merton London Borough Council election
 1994 Merton London Borough Council election (boundary changes took place but the number of seats remained the same)
 1998 Merton London Borough Council election (boundary changes took place but the number of seats remained the same)
 2002 Merton London Borough Council election (boundary changes increased the number of seats by three) 
 2006 Merton London Borough Council election
 2010 Merton London Borough Council election
 2014 Merton London Borough Council election
 2018 Merton London Borough Council election
 2022 Merton London Borough Council election (boundary changes reduced the number of seats by three)

By-election results

1964-1968
There were no by-elections.

1968-1971

1971-1974

1974-1978

1978-1982

The by-election was called following the death of Cllr. George Watt.

The by-election was called following the resignation of Cllr. William A. Hillhouse.

1982-1986

The by-election was called following the resignation of Cllr. Peter J. Glasspool.

The by-election was called following the death of Cllr. Michael L. Page.

The by-election was called following the resignation of Cllr. Nancy Bone.

The by-election was called following the resignation of Cllr. Robert A. Dilley.

1986-1990

The by-election was called following the death of Cllr. James B. Garwood.

The by-election was called following the death of Cllr. David Mason.

The by-election was called following the resignation of Cllr. David T. Williams.

The by-election was called following the resignation of Cllr. Kathryn E. Nicholls. The result meant that the Conservatives lost their one-seat majority on the council, placing the council under no overall control until the next election. This was the first election ever contested by the Merton Park Ward Residents Association, which had run in opposition to the council's proposed extension of the A24 relief road.

1990-1994

The by-election was called following the resignation of Cllr. Michael J. G. Menhinick.

1994-1998

The by-election was called following the death of Cllr. David R. Proctor.

The by-election was called following the death of Cllr. Arthur M. Kennedy.

1998-2002

The by-election was called following the resignation of Cllr. Terence J. Daniels.

The by-election was called following the resignation of Cllr. Jennifer Willott.

2002-2006

The by-election was called following the resignation of Cllr. Tony Giles.

The by-election was called following the resignation of Cllr. Leslie D. Mutch.

2006-2010
There were no by-elections.

2010-2014

The by-election was called following the resignation of Cllr. Tariq M. Ahmad.

The by-election was called following the death of Cllr. Gam Gurung.

2014-2018

The by-election was triggered by the death of Cllr. Maxi Martin of the Labour Party.

The by-election was triggered by the resignation of Cllr. Imran Uddin of the Labour Party.

2018-2022

The by-election was triggered by the resignation of Cllr. Mark Kenny of the Labour Party.

The by-election was triggered by the resignation of Cllr. Kelly Braund of the Labour Party.

References
Notes

References

 By-election results

External links
Merton Council